Jean-Louis Zanon (born December 23, 1961 in Montauban) is a French former professional football (soccer) player.

Zanon was a member of the French squad that won the gold medal at the 1984 Summer Olympics in Los Angeles, California.

References 
 
 Profile

1960 births
Living people
People from Montauban
French footballers
France international footballers
AS Saint-Étienne players
Olympique de Marseille players
FC Metz players
Nîmes Olympique players
AS Nancy Lorraine players
Ligue 1 players
Footballers at the 1984 Summer Olympics
Olympic footballers of France
Olympic gold medalists for France
Olympic medalists in football
Medalists at the 1984 Summer Olympics
Association football midfielders